Hong Kong competed at the 2014 Summer Youth Olympics, in Nanjing, China from 16 August to 28 August 2014.

Medalists
Medals awarded to participants of mixed-NOC (Combined) teams are represented in italics. These medals are not counted towards the individual NOC medal tally.

Badminton

Hong Kong qualified two athletes based on the 2 May 2014 BWF Junior World Rankings.

Singles

Doubles

Equestrian

Hong Kong qualified a rider.

Fencing

Hong Kong qualified three athletes based on its performance at the 2014 FIE Cadet World Championships.

Boys

Girls

Mixed Team

Golf

Hong Kong qualified one team of two athletes based on the 8 June 2014 IGF Combined World Amateur Golf Rankings.

Individual

Team

Sailing

Hong Kong qualified two boats based on its performance at the 2013 World Techno 293 Championships.

Swimming

Hong Kong qualified four swimmers.

Boys

Girls

Mixed

Table Tennis

Hong Kong qualified a female athlete based on its performance at the 2014 World Qualification Event. Hong Kong later qualified a male athlete based on its performance at the Asian Qualification Event.

Singles

Team

Qualification Legend: Q=Main Bracket (medal); qB=Consolation Bracket (non-medal)

Triathlon

Hong Kong qualified two athletes based on its performance at the 2014 Asian Youth Olympic Games Qualifier.

Individual

Relay

References

2014 in Hong Kong sport
Nations at the 2014 Summer Youth Olympics
Hong Kong at the Youth Olympics